The Amistad Dam Port of Entry is a port of entry into the United States from Mexico. It was built when Amistad Dam was completed in 1969.  The Dam was a bi-national effort to establish flood control on the Rio Grande and provide sources of water.  Although US Department of Transportation statistics combine traffic counts with Del Rio Texas Port of Entry, approximately 65,000 vehicles crossed the dam into the US in 2005.
The border station was rebuilt by the US Army Corps of Engineers in 2012.

References

See also

 List of Mexico–United States border crossings

Mexico–United States border crossings
1969 establishments in Texas
Buildings and structures completed in 1969
Buildings and structures in Val Verde County, Texas